Oleg Olegovich Yolkin (born 26 April 1986) is a Russian former professional football player.

Club career
He played 3 seasons in the Moldovan National Division.

External links
 
 

1986 births
People from Tiraspol
Living people
Russian footballers
Association football midfielders
CS Tiligul-Tiras Tiraspol players
FC Oryol players
FC Tyumen players
FC Znamya Truda Orekhovo-Zuyevo players
FC Tighina players
FC Lokomotiv Saint Petersburg players
Moldovan Super Liga players